Dennis McNamara may refer to:

 Denny McNamara (born 1952), Minnesota politician and member of the Minnesota House of Representatives
 Dennis McNamara (footballer) (born 1935), footballer for Tranmere Rovers